This is a list of the French SNEP Top 100 Singles, Top 50 Digital Singles, Top 200 Albums and Top 50 Digital Albums number-ones of 2008.

Number-ones by week

Singles chart

Albums chart

See also
2008 in music
List of number-one hits (France)
List of artists who reached number one on the French Singles Chart

References

Number-one hits
France
2008